The Women's 1 metre springboard competition at the 2022 World Aquatics Championships was held on 29 June 2022.

Results
The preliminary round was started at 10:00. The final was held at 17:00.

Green denotes finalists

References

Women's 1 metre springboard